Yang Bin (born July 10, 1989) is a Chinese Greco-Roman wrestler. He competed in the 75 kg event at the 2016 Summer Olympics and was eliminated in the repechage by Kim Hyeon-woo. Yang won one gold and two bronze medals at the Asian championships in 2014–2018. He also won a bronze medal at the 2018 Asian Games.

References

External links
 

1989 births
Living people
Chinese male sport wrestlers
Olympic wrestlers of China
Wrestlers at the 2016 Summer Olympics
Wrestlers at the 2014 Asian Games
Wrestlers at the 2018 Asian Games
Medalists at the 2018 Asian Games
Asian Games medalists in wrestling
Asian Games bronze medalists for China
Asian Wrestling Championships medalists
21st-century Chinese people